The 1987 Japanese Grand Prix was a Formula One motor race held at Suzuka on 1 November 1987. It was the fifteenth and penultimate race of the 1987 Formula One World Championship. 

The race was won by Austrian driver Gerhard Berger driving a Ferrari F1/87. It was the end of a 38-race losing streak for Formula One's most famous team and Berger's second Grand Prix victory having won the Mexican Grand Prix the previous year driving for Benetton. Berger won by 17 seconds over Brazilian driver Ayrton Senna driving a Lotus 99T. Third was the McLaren MP4/3 of Swedish driver Stefan Johansson.

Background 
The 1987 Japanese Grand Prix was the first race to be held in Japan since James Hunt won in his McLaren at Fuji, in 1977. This time, the Grand Prix circus utilised the Honda-owned Suzuka Circuit, which originated as a test track for Honda motorcycles and automobiles. 

Soichiro Honda was extremely enthusiastic about this race, and told his racing engineers "We have to win. And we have to keep winning..." aiming for a hometown victory at Honda's home track in its native Japan. Soichiro Honda had reason for optimism as four of the entrants were powered by Honda-made engines. The Lotus 99Ts of Ayrton Senna, who had won races earlier in the season and was joined on Team Lotus with national favourite Satoru Nakajima, along with the dominating Williams FW11Bs driven by Nigel Mansell and Nelson Piquet, who were both vying for the overall championship.

Qualifying 
The scene was set for a tense championship-deciding race between the Williams-Honda teammates, bitter rivals Nelson Piquet and Nigel Mansell. However, Mansell suffered a huge crash during Friday qualifying while trying to better Piquet's time, which put him out of action for both the Japanese race and the subsequent Australian Grand Prix. As a consequence, Piquet won his third World Championship before the race even began.

Qualifying once again demonstrated the return to form of Ferrari, as Gerhard Berger obtained his second pole position of the season, with the F1/87 being perfectly suited to the Suzuka circuit. Alain Prost qualified 2nd in his McLaren-TAG with Thierry Boutsen 3rd in his Benetton-Ford. Following Mansell's Friday crash, the three remaining Honda-powered cars of Piquet, Senna, and local favourite Satoru Nakajima, could only qualify in 5th, 7th and 11th places respectively. All drivers from 8th position and below moved up one position on the grid due to Mansell being unable to start. This also meant Roberto Moreno was permitted to race the AGS despite having the 27th fastest qualifying time.

Qualifying classification

Race
At the start Berger immediately imposed his authority by building a cushion. Prost, in his McLaren, perhaps the only driver capable of challenging Berger for the victory, suffered a puncture on the first lap and, therefore, was out of contention. Prost, however, drove a superb race to climb up through the field finishing just outside the points with the consolation of having the fastest lap. Boutsen's Benetton ran second early on but could not live with the pace set by Berger, ultimately fading to fifth. Piquet spent much of the race behind Senna's Lotus but was unable to find a way past his countryman. The new world champion eventually retired in the pits with oil pouring from the rear of his Williams. At one stage Stefan Johansson in the McLaren closed on Berger, but the Austrian driver responded and eventually romped to a seemingly effortless victory, the first Ferrari's victory since the 1985 German Grand Prix. Ayrton Senna dramatically passed Johansson on the last lap to take second place. Michele Alboreto, in the second Ferrari, got away very slowly at the green lights leaving him towards the rear of the field. However, the Italian drove an aggressive race to climb his way back up the order to finish an excellent fourth despite suffering from a dragging undertray causing a huge amount of sparks. Boutsen and Nakajima rounded out the points.

Johansson's third place was the 54th and last podium finish for the Porsche-designed TAG turbo V6 engine which had been first used in Formula One by McLaren at the 1983 Dutch Grand Prix.

Race classification

Championship standings after the race
Bold text indicates the World Champions.

Drivers' Championship standings

Constructors' Championship standings

Jim Clark Trophy standings

Colin Chapman Trophy standings

References

Japanese Grand Prix
Japanese Grand Prix
Grand Prix
Japanese Grand Prix